M-1 highway is a Montenegrin roadway.

The M-1 highway runs along the complete Montenegrin coast from its western border with Croatia all the way east to border with Albania. It goes through all the coastal cities in Montenegro (i.e. Herceg Novi, Kotor, Budva, Bar, Ulcinj). It is the starting point of all the highways that start at the coastline and go north like M1.1, M-2, M-8 and M12 and intersects with M-11 in Boka Bay, where M-11 can be used to shorten the distance by with using ferryboat from Kamenari to Lepetani.

History
The M-1 Highway was, from border with Croatia to Petrovac na Moru part of historical M-2 highway in Montenegro. Construction on this highway began in 1953 and finished in 1971. Section from Petrovac na Moru to border with Albania, previously knows as M-2.4 highway was officially opened for traffic in 1973.

In January 2016, the Ministry of Transport and Maritime Affairs published bylaw on categorisation of state roads. With new categorisation, M-1 highway was created, from part of previous M-2 highway, merging with previous M-2.4 Highway.

Major intersections

References

M-1